Murugappa may refer to:

 Murugappa family, Indian Nagarathar family
 A. M. M. Murugappa Chettiar (1902-1965), Indian industrialist
 Murugappa Polytechnic College, Avadi, Chennai, India
 Subbiah Murugappa Vellayan, Indian industrialist
 Murugappa Channaveerappa Modi (1916-2005), Indian ophthalmologist
 Murugappa Group, Indian business conglomerate